Dozens of father-and-son combinations have played or managed in Major League Baseball (MLB).

The first was Jack Doscher, son of Herm Doscher, who made his debut in 1903.

Ken Griffey Sr. and Ken Griffey Jr. became the first father-and-son duo to play in MLB at the same time, in 1989 when Ken Jr. was called up by the Seattle Mariners while Ken Sr. was playing with the Cincinnati Reds. They became Mariner teammates in 1990. In Ken Sr.'s first game as a Mariner, on August 31, 1990, the pair hit back-to-back singles in the first inning and both scored. On September 14, in the top of the first off California Angels pitcher Kirk McCaskill, the pair hit back-to-back home runs, the only father-son duo to do so. They played 51 games together before Ken Sr. retired in June 1991.

In 2001, Tim Raines and Tim Raines Jr. played as teammates with the Baltimore Orioles.

Cecil and Prince Fielder are the only father-son combination each to hit 50 or more home runs in any season. Cecil Fielder hit 51 homers in 1990; 17 years later, his son Prince, hit 50. Both Prince and Cecil hit exactly 319 home runs in their careers.

Six families have had a father and son serve as managers:

 the Macks: (Connie and Earle)
 the Sislers: (George and Dick)
 the Skinners: (Bob and Joel)
 the Boones: (Bob and Aaron)
 the Bells: (Buddy and David).
 the Rojas-Alous: Felipe Alou and Luis Rojas

Third-generation families
In 1992, Bret Boone became the first third-generation MLB player.

There are 5 third-generation MLB-player families:

 The Bells (Gus, Buddy, David, Mike)
 The Boones (Ray, Bob, Bret, Aaron)
 The Colemans (Joe, Joe Jr., Casey)
 The Hairstons (Sammy, Jerry, Johnny, Jerry Jr., Scott)
 The Schofield/Werths (Ducky Schofield, Dick Schofield, and Jayson Werth). Werth is the grandson of Ducky Schofield and nephew of Dick Schofield, and also the stepson of Dennis Werth.

In addition to the pairs listed above, there have been 21 other pairs of grandfathers and grandsons who played Major League Baseball. Two of the grandsons are well-known current players: Rick Porcello's maternal grandfather was Sam Dente, and Mike Yastrzemski's paternal grandfather is Hall of Famer Carl Yastrzemski.

There are third-generation families affiliated with MLB in roles other than team player:

 The Bossards (Emil, Marshall, Gene, Roger) are a family of MLB groundskeepers.
 The Carays (Harry, Skip, Chip) are a family of MLB Broadcasters.
 The DeWitts (brothers Bill DeWitt and Charlie: GM/owners of St. Louis Browns; William DeWitt Jr.: principal owner/managing partner of St. Louis Cardinals; Bill DeWitt III: St. Louis Cardinals President) are a family of MLB executives.
 The Rickeys (Branch Rickey, Branch Rickey Jr., Branch Barrett Rickey)
 The Runges (Ed, Paul, Brian) are a family of MLB Umpires.
 The Veecks (William Veeck Sr.: Chicago Cubs President; Bill Veeck: Cleveland Indians Owner, St. Louis Browns, and Chicago White Sox; Mike Veeck: owner of independent minor-league St. Paul Saints) are a family of MLB executives.

Potential four-generation families

As of 2020, there has never been a fourth-generation major league player.  However, two potential fourth-generation players have been drafted and/or signed to minor-league contracts.

In 2017, Jake Boone was selected by the Washington Nationals in the 38th round of the 2017 MLB Draft, but did not sign.  Jake's father is Bret Boone; his grandfather is Bob Boone; and his great-grandfather was the late Ray Boone. (Also, Aaron Boone is his uncle.)  Jake played college baseball at Princeton University for three seasons before signing a free-agent contract with the Nationals in July 2020. He was unable to play professional ball immediately after signing his contract because Minor League Baseball canceled its 2020 season. In 2021, he spent the entire season with Washington's Low-A East affiliate, the Fredericksburg Nationals. Heading into the 2022 season, Jake was reassigned to the National's Rookie-level affiliate, but was released on May 4, 2022.

Luke Bell was drafted by the Arizona Diamondbacks in the 34th round of the 2019 MLB Draft. His father Mike Bell was a 13-season minor leaguer who played briefly for the Cincinnati Reds in 2000 and was the vice president of player development for the Diamondbacks before his death in March 2021.  Luke Bell's uncle is David Bell; his grandfather is Buddy Bell; and his great-grandfather was the late Gus Bell. Luke Bell opted not to play Minor League Baseball in 2019 after he was drafted, In 2020 he made 5 appearances as a pitcher for Chandler-Gilbert Community College before the season was cut short by the COVID-19 pandemic. He transferred to Xavier University in 2021.

There are three known cases of a great-grandson following in his great-grandfather's footsteps to play Major League Baseball. Bill Wilkinson played for the Seattle Mariners from 1985 to 1988; his great-grandfather, Jim Bluejacket played for Brooklyn in the Federal League in 1914-15 and for the Cincinnati Reds in 1916.  More recently, Drew Pomeranz and his brother Stu Pomeranz, who played briefly in 2012, both followed in the footsteps of their great-grandfather Garland Buckeye who was a regular starting pitcher for the Cleveland Indians for three years in the mid-1920s and also appeared in one game each with two other teams.

The MacPhail family is the first family known to have four generations affiliated with Major League Baseball in roles other than as players. Larry was the general manager of the Reds and Dodgers as well as the president, general manager, and co-owner of the Yankees. Larry's son, Lee, was president and general manager of the Orioles, executive vice president and general manager of the Yankees, and president of the American League. Larry and Lee are also the only father-and-son duo to have been inducted into the Baseball Hall of Fame. The MacPhails became baseball's first three-generation family when Lee MacPhail III became an executive with the Reading Phillies of the Eastern League. Lee II's other son, Andy, is the president of the Phillies and was previously general manager of the Twins, president and chief executive officer of the Cubs, and president of baseball operations for the Orioles. The family became baseball's first four-generation family with Lee MacPhail III's son, Lee MacPhail IV, who has served as director of scouting for the Indians, Expos, Nationals, and Orioles.

Key

List of players

Second–generation

Third–generation

Other second-generation MLB personnel

Parent played in top-level professional baseball

The following families had a parent play top-level professional baseball in a league other than the MLB and a child who played in the MLB.

Umpiring families

 The National and American Leagues consolidated umpiring crews beginning in the  season; umpires who worked after the consolidation are denoted with "MLB".
 Joe Crawford, another son of Shag Crawford and brother of Jerry Crawford, is an official in the National Basketball Association.

See also
List of second-generation National Football League players
List of second-generation National Basketball Association players

References

External links
Baseball Almanac
Major League Umpires All-time Roster. MLB.com

Second generation
Major League Baseball
Baseball